Jhon Jairo Rivera Valencia (born February 23, 1972) is a Colombian Colombian popular music singer, actor and businessman known as Jhonny Rivera.

Biography 

A Colombian singer and second cousin of Pablo Escobar.

A broken heart led him to compose his first release  The Pain of A Game ', followed by others, including 'I'm Single' 'and' 'Best Sólito' 'with which he garnered a local regional recognition titled Premios Nuestra Tierra  a Best Tropical Song.

He has made more than twelve tours, including to Spain, Ecuador, United States, Venezuela and Aruba.

In the 2009 he relaunched his career with a tropical song titled  The Shy  which is somewhat popular on YouTube.

In 2010 he released  My Only Treasure  with J Balvin.
At the beginning of 2012 her new album  Te Sigo Wanting  contains the song  For A Beer, which is also somewhat popular on YouTube
He also made a bachata with his son Andy Rivera entitled  The Pay That Makes' 'after premieres The Pegao ' which received a local recognition titled Feria de Cali and was also somewhat popular on YouTube

In 2015, this artist promoted a new song Por Andar Enamorao.He has been making more music since then.

His best year was 2019.

 Personal life 

Jhon Jairo Rivera Valencia  was born in Pereira, Colombia, to parents Maria Mabel Valencia and Jose Oscar Rivera, and his brothers Juliet, Luz Piedad and Oscar Mario.

At 17, he left the village Perez in Arabia - Pereira to Bogota where he lived a very difficult time getting any job but none maintained its economic situation, girlfriend went to live with where they had a son. She left him to go to Spain and later his son was. He says were the most difficult moments of his life to trying to kill himself. He returned to his home in Pereira where he had the opportunity to write and record a song which sent him to success. Not seen him officially a couple but rumors have been involved in emotional situations. His son Andy Rivera returned from Spain and followed in his footsteps as a singer but in the urban genre, now built his own house which has horses, chariots andlujos.

 Filmography 

 Collaborations 
 Let's start Zero (feat. Lady Yuliana)
 Por Que Se Fue (feat. Charrito Negro)
 Se Que Te Falle (feat. Lady Yuliana)
 My Only Treasure (feat. J Balvin)
 Jealousy "Live" (feat. Fanny Lu)
 Love and Spite (feat. Jhon Alex Castaño)
 Al Bailo Son Que Me Blow (feat. Pipe Bueno)
 Did They Do not exchange (feat. Yolanda del Rio)
 Papi (feat.  'Ricardo Torres and his Mariachi'')
 The Pay ago That (feat. Andy Rivera)
 El Tiempo Dira Quien Miente (feat. Lady Yuliana)
 Me Voy A Casar (feat. Dario Gomez)
 Ser Colombiano Es Un Lujo (feat. El Orejón)
 Así Es La Vida (feat. Mauro Ayala)
 Como Duele (feat. Los Hermanos Medina)
 Comamos Sano (feat. Mauricio López)
 Siga Bebiendo (feat. Yeison Jiménez)
 Como Una Pelota (feat. Espinoza Paz)

Label

 Ya No Dudes De Mi (2004)
 Soy Soltero (2006)
 Solo Exito (2007)
 Una Voz Que Llega A Alma (2007)
 El Intenso (2008)
 Tengo Rabia Con migo (2010)
 Te Sigo Queriendo (2012)
 No Hay Porque Esperar (2014)

See also

 Popular Colombian music
 Vallenato musical genre
 Giovanny Ayala
 Darío Gómez
 Yeison Jimenez
 Paola Jara
 Jhon Alex Castaño
 Pipe Bueno

References

External links 
 Jhonny Rivera Official Website
 Jhonny Rivera on Facebook
 Jhonny Rivera on Twitter
 Jhonny Rivera on YouTube

1974 births
Living people
21st-century Colombian male singers
People from Pereira, Colombia
Colombian pop singers